Weight classes are divisions of competition used to match competitors against others of their own size. Weight classes are used in a variety of sports, especially combat sports (such as boxing, kickboxing, mixed martial arts and wrestling). Alternatives to formal weight classes include catch weight and openweight.

The existence of weight divisions gives rise to the practice of weight cutting. To be  the largest individual in a weight division is perceived as advantageous; therefore many athletes lose weight through dieting and dehydration prior to weigh-ins to qualify for a lower weight class.

Comparison
Below are selected maximum weight limits in kg, for the major classes in different sports.

See also
 Brazilian Jiu-Jitsu weight classes
Boxing weight classes
Judo weight classes
Kickboxing weight classes
Mixed martial arts weight classes
Professional wrestling weight classes
Taekwondo weight classes
Wrestling weight classes

References